Crinita is a genus of short-horned grasshoppers in the family Acrididae. There are at least two described species in Crinita from the Middle East.

Species
These two species belong to the genus Crinita:
 Crinita hirtipes (Uvarov, 1923) - type species - locality Jericho, Palestine
 Crinita nigripes (Uvarov, 1929)

References

Acrididae
Oedipodinae